Actis (formerly, Highberg, Rummington, and Gloster) is an unincorporated community in Kern County, California. It is situated between Mojave and Rosamond at Backus  Road and California State Route 14.

The Highberg post office opened in 1917, changed its name to Rummington in 1918, and closed for good in 1927.

Climate

References

Unincorporated communities in Kern County, California
Unincorporated communities in California